Sir Simon Weston (1565–1637) was an English Knight and politician, personal ally of the Earls of Essex, who sat in the House of Commons between 1624 and 1626. He was involved in the Earl's of Essex rebellion against Queen Elizabeth Tudor.

History

Weston  was the son of James Weston, diocesan registrar and a Lichfield MP, by his wife, Margery Lowe, daughter of Humphrey Lowe of Lichfield, England. The Westons, father and son, lived at St John's Hospital in Lichfield, and were a cadet branch of the Westons of Rugeley, which included Sir Richard Weston of Hagley Hall. It is also stated that they were related to the Weston family of Robert Weston, Lord Chancellor of Ireland, and grandnephew of Ralph Neville, 4th Earl of Westmorland.

In August 1599, he was knighted by Robert Devereux, 2nd Earl of Essex of Chartley Castle, and Lord lieutenant of Staffordshire, who was a Royal favourite at the time. The Earl's network was very influential, him being a great-grandson of Mary Boleyn, sister of Queen Anne Boleyn, and nephew of William Knollys, 1st Earl of Banbury of Caversham Park. His uncle was married to a cousin of the Queen, while his own wife, Frances Burke, Countess of Clanricarde, was the daughter of the Secretary of State, Sir Francis Walsingham, Elizabeth's spymaster.

Weston was then elected High Sheriff of Staffordshire  in 1610. He was later accused of participating in the Earl's of Essex rebellion against Queen Elizabeth Tudor, which involved Henry Wriothesley, 3rd Earl of Southampton, Charles Howard, 1st Earl of Nottingham and Robert Cecil, 1st Earl of Salisbury, among others. Weston initially evaded capture but was later brought in front of the Privy Council, and given to the custody of his brother-in-law, Bishop Martin Heton, the Vice-Chancellor of the University of Oxford.

After successfully denying his involvement in the uprising, despite his close relationship with rebel Sir Christopher Blount, he was set free in 1602, and was awarded a Royal Lordship under King James I of England. In 1607, Weston invited to his home the Secretary of State, Robert Cecil of Hatfield House, son of Lord William Cecil of Burghley House, the Chief minister of Queen Elizabeth Tudor. He married thereafter his only child, Elizabeth Weston, to Robert Ridgeway, son and heir of Thomas Ridgeway, 1st Earl of Londonderry, paying a dowry of £6,000.

His father was well connected with the Earls of Essex as well, as he had previously joined the Essex-Raleigh Expedition, a military campaign against the Habsburgs of Spain and Netherlands. He also held the positions of Vice-Treasurer of Ireland and Treasurer-at-Wars under Lord George Carey, member of the Carey family. Robert's sister was Cassandra Ridgeway, and was married to Sir Francis Willoughby, son of Sir Percival Willoughby of Wollaton Hall, and became the grandmother of Cassandra Willoughby, Duchess of Chandos, member of the Willoughby family. 

Weston later became Deputy lieutenant and a personal trustee of Robert Devereux, 3rd Earl of Essex, brother of Frances Seymour, Duchess of Somerset, who was also Vice-Admiral and Chief Commander of the Parliamentarian army. In 1622, he succeeded the Earl of Bridgewater, John Egerton of the Egerton family, as Recorder (Judge) of Lichfield, an important judicial office. In 1624, Weston was elected Member of Parliament for Lichfield, replacing his relative Sir Richard Weston. In 1625 he was elected MP for  Staffordshire and was re-elected in 1626, replacing Sir Edward Littleton, of the Lyttelton family of Merevale Hall.

Family 

Weston married Mary Lloyd, daughter of John Lloyd, Judge of the High Court of Admiralty, and co founder with Queen Elizabeth Tudor, of the first Protestant College at the University of Oxford.

Weston's sister-in-law was Frances Lloyd, spouse of Dr. David Yale, the Chancellor of Chester, and nephew of Chancellor Thomas Yale of Plas yn Yale, Wales.

Weston's daughter, Elizabeth Weston, married Robert Ridgeway, 2nd Earl of Londonderry, son of Thomas Ridgeway, 1st Earl of Londonderry. 

Elizabeth Weston's nephew, Francis Willughby, was the owner of Wollaton Hall, the family seat of the Willoughby family

Thereafter, Weston lived in relative obscurity, although around 1632 he reached for help to the Secretary of State, Sir John Coke, on behalf of his daughter Elizabeth and her children, who had been deserted and left unsupported by her husband, Robert Ridgeway, 2nd Earl of Londonderry.

References

 

1563 births
1637 deaths
High Sheriffs of Staffordshire
Simon
16th-century English people
English MPs 1624–1625
English MPs 1625
English MPs 1626